The 2016–17 HC Slovan Bratislava season will be the 5th season for Bratislava based club in Kontinental Hockey League.

Schedule and results

Pre-season

|-bgcolor= ddffdd
|1||July 27|| Torpedo Nizhny Novgorod|| 2–3 ||Slovan Bratislava|| Maribor, Slovenia||||
|-bgcolor= ddffdd
|2||July 29|| PSG Zlín|| 2–3 ||Slovan Bratislava|| Zimní stadion Luďka Čajky||2,700||
|-bgcolor= ffbbbb
|3||August 3|| HC Sparta Praha|| 4–2 ||Slovan Bratislava|| O2 Arena||||
|-bgcolor= ffbbbb
|4||August 4|| HC Kometa Brno|| 5–3 ||Slovan Bratislava|| DRFG Arena||5,212||
|-bgcolor= ddffdd
|5||August 9||Slovan Bratislava || 2–1 || HC Kometa Brno|| Ondrej Nepela Arena||5,260||
|-bgcolor= ffbbbb
|6||August 11|| Linköpings HC|| 4–2 ||Slovan Bratislava || Werk Arena||511||
|-bgcolor= ddffdd
|7||August 12|| HC Oceláři Třinec|| 2–3 ||Slovan Bratislava || Werk Arena||2,925||
|-bgcolor= ddffdd
|8||August 14|| HC Vítkovice Steel|| 0–2 ||Slovan Bratislava || Werk Arena||||
|-bgcolor= ffeeaa
|9||August 16||Slovan Bratislava || 2–3 SO || KHL Medveščak Zagreb|| Ondrej Nepela Arena||5,127||
|-bgcolor= ddffdd
|10||August 18||Slovan Bratislava || 5–2 || PSG Zlín|| Ondrej Nepela Arena||3,730||
|-

|-
| align="center"|

Regular season

|-bgcolor= ffbbbb
|1||23||Ak Bars|| 2–1 ||Slovan Bratislava|| Pogge ||TatNeft Arena || 8,890 ||0–0–0–1||
|-bgcolor= ffbbbb
|2||25||Lada Togliatti|| 5–2 ||Slovan Bratislava|| Brust ||Lada Arena || 4,550 ||0–0–0–2||
|-bgcolor= ddffdd
|3||29||Slovan Bratislava|| 7–4 ||Torpedo Nizhny Novgorod|| Pogge ||Ondrej Nepela Arena || 8,773 ||1–0–0–2||
|-bgcolor= ddffdd
|4||31||Slovan Bratislava|| 3–1 ||HC Sochi|| Brust ||Ondrej Nepela Arena || 8,697 ||2–0–0–2||
|-

|-bgcolor= ffbbbb
|5||4||Slovan Bratislava || 1–2 || Spartak Moscow|| Brust ||Ondrej Nepela Arena  || 9,254 ||2–0–0–3||
|-bgcolor= ffbbbb
|6||9||Metallurg Novokuznetsk || 2–1 || Slovan Bratislava|| Pogge ||Sports Palace  || 2,395 ||2–0–0–4||
|-bgcolor= ddffdd
|7||11||Avangard Omsk || 3–4 || Slovan Bratislava|| Brust ||Arena Omsk  || 9,870 ||3–0–0–4||
|-bgcolor= ffeeaa
|8||13||Sibir Novosibirsk || 3–2 SO || Slovan Bratislava|| Brust ||Ice Sports Palace  || 7,400 ||3–0–1–4||
|-bgcolor= d0e7ff
|9||17||Slovan Bratislava || 3–2 SO ||  Medveščak Zagreb|| Pogge, Brust ||Ondrej Nepela Arena  || 9,580 ||3–1–1–4||
|-bgcolor= ffbbbb
|10||20||Metallurg Magnitogorsk || 4–2 ||Slovan Bratislava || Pogge ||Arena Metallurg  || 6,370 ||3–1–1–5||
|-bgcolor= ffbbbb
|11||22||Salavat Yulaev Ufa || 6–3 ||Slovan Bratislava || Pogge ||Ufa Arena  || 6,537 ||3–1–1–6||
|-bgcolor= ddffdd
|12||24||Traktor Chelyabinsk || 1–3 ||Slovan Bratislava || Brust ||Traktor Ice Arena  || 7,000 ||4–1–1–6||
|-bgcolor= ffbbbb
|13||30|| Medveščak Zagreb || 6–0 ||Slovan Bratislava || Brust, Pogge ||Arena Zagreb  || 5,026 ||4–1–1–7||
|-

|-bgcolor= ffeeaa
|14||2||Slovan Bratislava || 1–2 OT || CSKA Moscow|| Brust ||Ondrej Nepela Arena  || 10,055 ||4–1–2–7||
|-bgcolor= ffbbbb
|15||4||Slovan Bratislava || 0–6 || SKA Saint Petersburg|| Brust ||Ondrej Nepela Arena  || 10,055 ||4–1–2–8||
|-bgcolor= ddffdd
|16||6||Slovan Bratislava || 3–2 || Severstal Cherepovets|| Brust ||Ondrej Nepela Arena  || 7,613 ||5–1–2–8||
|-bgcolor= d0e7ff
|17||10||Lokomotiv Yaroslavl || 2–3 OT || Slovan Bratislava|| Pogge ||Arena 2000  || 7,986 ||5–2–2–8||
|-bgcolor= ddffdd
|18||12||Dynamo Moscow || 3–5 || Slovan Bratislava|| Brust ||VTB Ice Palace  || 4,653 ||6–2–2–8||
|-bgcolor= ffbbbb
|19||14||Vityaz || 3–2 || Slovan Bratislava|| Brust ||Vityaz Ice Palace  || 3,250 ||6–2–2–9||
|-bgcolor= ffbbbb
|20||17||Slovan Bratislava || 2–5 || Neftekhimik Nizhnekamsk|| Pogge, Brust ||Ondrej Nepela Arena  || 7,576 ||6–2–2–10||
|-bgcolor= d0e7ff
|21||19||Slovan Bratislava || 2–1 OT || Ak Bars Kazan|| Brust ||Ondrej Nepela Arena  || 8,187 ||6–3–2–10||
|-bgcolor= ddffdd
|22||21||Slovan Bratislava || 3–2 || Lada Togliatti|| Brust ||Ondrej Nepela Arena  || 9,729 ||7–3–2–10||
|-bgcolor= ffbbbb
|23||25||SKA Saint Petersburg || 6–1 || Slovan Bratislava|| Brust, Pogge ||Ice Palace  || 11,981 ||7–3–2–11||
|-bgcolor= ffbbbb
|24||27||CSKA Moscow || 4–2 || Slovan Bratislava|| Pogge ||CSKA Ice Palace  || 3,300 ||7–3–2–12||
|-bgcolor= ddffdd
|25||29||Severstal Cherepovets || 1–3 || Slovan Bratislava|| Brust ||Ice Palace  || 3,960 ||8–3–2–12||
|-

|-bgcolor= ddffdd
|26||8||Avtomobilist Yekaterinburg || 1–4 || Slovan Bratislava|| Pogge ||KRK Uralets  || 3,700 ||9–3–2–12||
|-bgcolor= ffbbbb
|27||10|| Barys Astana || 5–1 || Slovan Bratislava|| Pogge ||Barys Arena  || 4,220 ||9–3–2–13||
|-bgcolor= ffbbbb
|28||12|| HC Ugra || 2–1 || Slovan Bratislava|| Brust ||Arena Ugra  || 3,300 ||9–3–2–14||
|-bgcolor= ddffdd
|29||15|| Slovan Bratislava || 2–1 ||  Jokerit|| Brust ||Ondrej Nepela Arena   || 10,055 ||10–3–2–14||
|-bgcolor= ffeeaa
|30||17|| Slovan Bratislava || 1–2 SO ||  Dinamo Riga|| Brust ||Ondrej Nepela Arena   || 10,055 ||10–3–3–14||
|-bgcolor= ffbbbb
|31||19|| Slovan Bratislava || 1–2 ||  Dinamo Minsk|| Brust ||Ondrej Nepela Arena   || 10,055 ||10–3–3–15||
|-bgcolor= ffbbbb
|32||22|| Sochi || 3–0 || Slovan Bratislava|| Brust ||Bolshoy Ice Dome   || 5,238 ||10–3–3–16||
|-bgcolor= ddffdd
|33||24|| Torpedo Nizhny Novgorod || 1–4 || Slovan Bratislava|| Pogge ||CEC Nagorny || 5,500 ||11–3–3–16||
|-bgcolor= ffbbbb
|34||26|| Spartak Moscow || 4–2 || Slovan Bratislava|| Pogge ||Luzhniki Small Arena || 7,511 ||11–3–3–17||
|-bgcolor= ffbbbb
|35||30|| Slovan Bratislava || 2–5 || Sibir Novosibirsk|| Brust ||Ondrej Nepela Arena  || 7,458 ||11–3–3–18||
|-

|-bgcolor= ffeeaa
|36||2|| Slovan Bratislava || 4–5 SO || Metallurg Novokuznetsk|| Brust ||Ondrej Nepela Arena  || 7,360 ||11–3–4–18||
|-bgcolor= ffbbbb
|37||3|| Slovan Bratislava || 3–5 || Avangard Omsk|| Pogge ||Ondrej Nepela Arena  || 9,833 ||11–3–4–19||
|-bgcolor= ffbbbb
|38||6||  Dinamo Minsk || 4–1 || Slovan Bratislava|| Brust ||Minsk-Arena  || 10,869 ||11–3–4–20||
|-bgcolor= ddffdd
|39||8||  Jokerit || 1–3 || Slovan Bratislava|| Pogge ||Hartwall Arena  || 8,689 ||12–3–4–20||
|-bgcolor= ffbbbb
|40||10||  Dinamo Riga || 3–2 || Slovan Bratislava|| Pogge ||Inbox.lv ledus halle  || 1,184 ||12–3–4–21||
|-bgcolor= ddffdd
|41||20|| Slovan Bratislava || 4–1 || Salavat Yulaev Ufa|| Brust ||Ondrej Nepela Arena  || 6,770 ||13–3–4–21||
|-bgcolor= ddffdd
|42||21|| Slovan Bratislava || 1–0 || Traktor Chelyabinsk|| Brust ||Ondrej Nepela Arena  || 6,844 ||14–3–4–21||
|-bgcolor= ffbbbb
|43||23|| Slovan Bratislava || 2–4 || Metallurg Magnitogorsk|| Pogge ||Ondrej Nepela Arena  || 10,055 ||14–3–4–22||
|-bgcolor= d0e7ff
|44||26|| Slovan Bratislava || 5–4 SO || Spartak Moscow|| Brust ||Ondrej Nepela Arena  || 10,055 ||14–4–4–22||
|-

|-bgcolor= ddffdd
|45||3|| Slovan Bratislava || 2–0 || Amur Khabarovsk|| Brust ||Ondrej Nepela Arena  || 9,205 ||15–4–4–22||
|-bgcolor= ffeeaa
|46||5|| Slovan Bratislava || 1–2 OT ||  Kunlun Red Star|| Pogge ||Ondrej Nepela Arena  || 10,055 ||15–4–5–22||
|-bgcolor= ddffdd
|47||8|| Slovan Bratislava || 3–2 || Admiral Vladivostok|| Brust ||Ondrej Nepela Arena  || 8,681 ||16–4–5–22||
|-bgcolor= d0e7ff
|48||11|| Slovan Bratislava || 3–2 OT || Avtomobilist Yekaterinburg|| Brust ||Ondrej Nepela Arena  || 7,624 ||16–5–5–22||
|-bgcolor= ddffdd
|49||13|| Slovan Bratislava || 4–1 ||  Barys Astana|| Brust ||Ondrej Nepela Arena  || 9,566 ||17–5–5–22||
|-bgcolor= ddffdd
|50||15|| Slovan Bratislava || 3–2 ||  HC Ugra|| Brust ||Ondrej Nepela Arena  || 9,708 ||18–5–5–22||
|-bgcolor= ddffdd
|51||17|| Spartak Moscow || 0–3 || Slovan Bratislava|| Brust ||Luzhniki Small Arena|| 7,284 ||19–5–5–22||
|-bgcolor= ddffdd
|52||19|| Neftekhimik Nizhnekamsk || 2–3 || Slovan Bratislava|| Brust ||SCC Arena|| 5,300 ||20–5–5–22||
|-bgcolor= ddffdd
|53||24|| Amur Khabarovsk || 1–2 || Slovan Bratislava|| Brust ||Platinum Arena|| 7,000 ||21–5–5–22||
|-bgcolor= ffbbbb
|54||26||  Kunlun Red Star || 2–0 || Slovan Bratislava|| Brust ||LeSports Center|| 2,400 ||21–5–5–23||
|-bgcolor= ffbbbb
|55||28|| Admiral Vladivostok || 2–1 || Slovan Bratislava|| Brust ||Fetisov Arena|| 5,841 ||21–5–5–24||
|-bgcolor= d0e7ff
|56||31|| Slovan Bratislava || 3–2 SO ||  Lokomotiv Yaroslavl|| Brust ||Ondrej Nepela Arena  || 10,055 ||21–6–5–24||
|-

|-bgcolor= ffbbbb
|57||2|| Slovan Bratislava || 1–2 ||  Dynamo Moscow|| Pogge ||Ondrej Nepela Arena  || 10,055 ||21–6–5–25||
|-bgcolor= ffbbbb
|58||3|| Slovan Bratislava || 1–6 ||  Vityaz|| Brust ||Ondrej Nepela Arena  || 10,055 ||21–6–5–26||
|-bgcolor= d0e7ff
|59||14||  Medveščak Zagreb || 4–5 OT ||  Slovan Bratislava|| Brust, Pogge ||Ondrej Nepela Arena  || 6,814 ||21–7–5–26||
|-bgcolor= ddffdd
|60||15|| Slovan Bratislava || 7–5 ||   Medveščak Zagreb|| Pogge ||Ondrej Nepela Arena  || 10,055 ||22–7–5–26||
|-

|-
|align="center"|

Standings

Western Conference

Team statistics
All statistics are for regular season only.

Notes

Source:

Roster changes

Players Joining

Players Leaving

Player signings
This is the list of all players that extended their contracts with HC Slovan Bratislava:

Players lost via retirement

See also
HC Slovan Bratislava all-time KHL record
List of HC Slovan Bratislava seasons

References

Bratislava
HC Slovan Bratislava seasons
Bratislava